Alicia Glen  is a civil servant who served as Deputy Mayor for housing and economic development for the City of New York from 2014 to 2019. She was appointed by Bill De Blasio, and stepped down in early 2019.

In June 2022, Glen was appointed by Governor Kathy Hochul to the Gateway Commission. She serves as Co-Chair. 

Glen is the founding manager and principal at MSquared, a real estate development company in NYC.

Glen is the Chair of the Trust for Governor's Island.

See also
 Dean Fuleihan
 Anthony Shorris
 Stanley Brezenoff
 Kathryn Garcia

References

Deputy mayors of New York City
Year of birth missing (living people)
Living people